James Kennedy (born November 5, 1950) is an American social psychologist, best known as an originator and researcher of particle swarm optimization. The first papers on the topic, by Kennedy and Russell C. Eberhart, were presented in 1995; since then tens of thousands of papers have been published on particle swarms. The Academic Press / Morgan Kaufmann book, Swarm Intelligence, by Kennedy and Eberhart with Yuhui Shi, was published in 2001.

The particle swarm paradigm draws on social-psychological simulation research in which Kennedy had participated at the University of North Carolina, integrated with evolutionary computation methods that Eberhart had been working with in the 1990s. The result was a problem-solving or optimization algorithm based on the principles of human social interaction. Individuals begin the program with random guesses at the problem solution. As the program runs, the "particles" share their successes with their topological neighbors; each particle is both teacher and learner. Over time, the population converges reliably on optimal vectors.

While there has been a trend in the research literature toward a "Gbest" or centralized particle network, Blackwell and Kennedy (2018) demonstrated the importance of a distributed population topology in solving more complex problems.

A recent paper discusses the possible contribution of human female orgasm to the species' prosociality.

Kennedy has been an active combatant in the controversy over sex education in Montgomery County, Maryland, supporting the public schools' efforts to develop a comprehensive and inclusive program. He also worked to support a gender identity nondiscrimination law in Montgomery County that came under attack from conservatives, and has maintained an online progressive presence.

He also worked as a professional musician for fifty years and currently plays in a rockabilly band called The Colliders, which released albums in 2011 and 2015. In 2018 Kennedy released a DIY album, The Life of Mischief, and is currently organizing live performance of that material.

Kennedy worked in survey methods for the US government, and has conducted basic and applied research into social effects on cognition and attitude. He served as Director of the Office of Analysis and Research Services at the US International Trade Commission until his retirement in 2017. He has worked with particle swarms since 1994, with research publications in fields related and unrelated to swarms and surveys.

See also
 Particle Swarm Optimization

Further reading
 Kennedy, J., Eberhart, R. C., with Shi, Y. (2001) Swarm Intelligence.  Morgan Kaufmann / Academic Press.
 Jim Kennedy: "A Tolerant, Scientific Approach", Washington Post, August 24, 2005.
 The Colliders
 Kennedy, J. (2004).  "Particle swarms: optimization based on sociocognition".  In L. N. de Castro and F. J. Von Zuben (Eds.) Recent Developments in Biologically Inspired Computing.  Hershey, PA: The Idea Group, Inc.
 Kennedy, J. (2004)  "Swarm intelligence".  In A. Zomaya (Ed.), Handbook of Innovative Computational Paradigms: Biological and Adaptive Computing, 187-220. New York: Springer-Verlag.
 Kennedy, J. (2002). "We don’t think the way we think we think. Review of Wegner’s The Illusion of Conscious Will". Science, 296, 1973.
 Kennedy, J., and  Eberhart, R. C. (1999).  "The particle swarm: Social adaptation in information-processing systems", in D. Corne, M. Dorigo, and F. Glover (eds.), New Ideas in Optimization, London: McGraw-Hill.
 Kennedy, J., and Mendes, R. (2006).  "Neighborhood topologies in fully informed and best-of-neighborhood particle swarms".  IEEE Transactions on Systems, Man, and Cybernetics, Part C: Applications and Reviews, 36 (4), 515-519.
 Clerc, M., and Kennedy, J. (2002). "The particle swarm: Explosion, stability, and convergence in a multi-dimensional complex space".  IEEE Transactions on Evolutionary Computation, 6, 58-73.
 Kennedy, J. (1999). "Minds and cultures: Particle swarm implications for beings in sociocognitive space". Adaptive Behavior Journal, 7, 269-288.
 Kennedy, J., and Pavličev, M. (2018). "Female orgasm and the emergence of prosocial empathy: An evo-devo perspective." Journal of Experimental Zoology Part B: Molecular and Developmental Evolution. doi:10.1002/jez.b.22795
 Blackwell, T., and Kennedy, J. (2018). "Impact of communication topology in particle swarm optimization." IEEE Transactions on Evolutionary Computation. DOI: 10.1109/TEVC.2018.2880894 

Social psychologists
American psychology writers
American male non-fiction writers
1950 births
Living people